Kalani High School is a four-year public high school located in East Honolulu, Hawaii, USA. Kalani is a part of the Hawaii Department of Education. Kalani is located on Kalanianaole Highway. It is accredited by the Western Association of Schools and Colleges.

Opened in 1958, Kalani serves the residential areas of Niu Valley, Āina Haina, Āina Koa, Maunalani Heights, Waialae-Kāhala, Kāhala, and portions of the Kaimukī area. The current principal is Mitchell Otani.

Kalani's facilities include: 9 main buildings, a physical education locker/trainer facility, cafeteria, gymnasium, several portable buildings which serve as a temporary home for the Red Cross, a large building for their musical department, a swimming pool, tennis courts/basketball courts, and a marching band practice/soccer field/football field surrounded by a dirt track. A separate Judo room, and girls locker room was added in 2018.

In the 2000 U.S. Census the U.S. Census Bureau defined Kalani High as being in the urban Honolulu census-designated place. For the 2010 U.S. Census the bureau created a new census-designated place, East Honolulu.

Athletics
Starting in the 1960s there was a decline in major athletics which was exacerbated by the opening of the Kaiser High School district in 1971. The lone exception was the 1970 baseball team as State Champion, which included Lenn Sakata, who went on to play for the Milwaukee Brewers and NY Yankees.

However, the school did excel and dominate in some of the smaller sports during this period.  Including Boys Division 1 Cross Country with four consecutive OIA championships and three consecutive State championships in 1971 – 1973 under George Butterfield.  This is the schools longest run of State domination.  Although in later years from 1973 to 1994 there were multiple State Championships for Tennis and Bowling for boys and girls.

Kalani currently holds the Oahu Interscholastic Association (OIA) Eastern division title in girls varsity soccer, and boys varsity soccer. In the school year 2005–2006, the girls varsity basketball team won the State Division II Championship and in 2007–2008 won the OIA championship. The girls volleyball team won the OIA Championship in the 2003 season. However, the school's most notable team in recent years is their men's soccer team, which placed second in the OIA and in the State in 2007, and won in 2013. The men's soccer team is a regular contender for the state title, and remains one of the top programs in Hawaii.

The school's tennis team also took the 2010 season OIA Championship and was runner-up in the 2010 State championships. Kalani tennis boasted a back-to-back singles state champion from 2009–2010, Jared Spiker. In 2009, Spiker became the first O‘ahu Interscholastic Association player to win a state singles tennis title in 26 years.

Alma mater
Where the trade winds from the ocean
Whisper softly through the valley
Mighty pillars of Kalani
Will for ever stand.

Where the trade winds from the ocean
Whisper softly through the valley
Proudly wave Kalani's banner
Over all the land.

Rising for thy glory
Rising in thy honor
Our spirits pledged will e'er be true
For loyalty and love will leave us never.

Onward 'tis the faith that leads us
Towards the goals that stand before us,
Forward then, Kalani High
All praise to thee!

Academics
 Kalani High School is listed "in good standing, unconditional" according to the No Child Left Behind assessment tests.
 Kalani High School's curriculum is based on the Hawaii Content and Performance Standards (HCPS III) to ensure a high quality education for all of its students.
 Kalani High School also uses Schoolwide General Learner Outcomes (GLOs) to gauge student learning and growth.  The GLOs are:
 Self-Directed Learner
 Community Contributor
 Complex Thinker and Problem-Solver
 Quality Producer
 Effective Communicator
 Effective and Ethical Users of Technology

 Advance Placement courses are offered for Calculus, Junior and Senior level English, Chemistry, Physics, Biology, Chinese, U.S. History, Economics, World History, Psychology, Computer Science, Research and Seminar

Awards and Honors
 2010 – 3rd Place High School Division – Science Olympiad Statewide Tournament
 2010  – 1st Place High School Division – Science Olympiad Windward Regional Tournament
 2011 – 3rd Place High School Division – Science Olympiad Windward Regional Tournament

Robotics
Kalani High School is the home of FIRST team 3008 Kalani Robotics.  Started in 2009, the team has been very successful, qualifying for FIRST Championship six years in a row.  The team participates in a variety of challenges: Vex Robotics Competition, FIRST Tech Challenge, and FIRST Robotics Competition.  The team participates in a variety of outreach events such as workshops, fairs, as well as demonstrations.  The team has become widely known for their "Bristlebots" – a toothbrush head with a micro-motor mounted on it that causes it to scurry around.

 2009 – Rookie Inspiration Award – FIRST Robotics
 2010 – Regional Chairman's Award – FIRST Robotics
 2011 – Tournament Champion – VEX Robotics
 2012 -Regional Chairman's Award – FIRST Robotics
 2013 – Hawaii Regional Champions – FIRST Robotics
 2014 – Alamo Regional Champions – FIRST Robotics

Small Learning Communities
Freshmen students are grouped into Small Learning Communities (SLCs) which consists of team teachers.  Houses include teachers from Social studies, Science and English departments as well as counselors and Special Education teachers.
At Kalani High School, SLCs take the form of houses in 9th grade well as career-oriented academies/pathways during 10th, 11th, and 12th grade.  The primary purpose of houses is to help support students with the transition from middle to high school and to prepare them for entrance into the academies/pathways during their sophomore, junior, and senior years.
Kalani High School SLCs have three main goals:
To create academic rigor and relevance
To create personalization
To create professional learning communities
 House/Grade Level/School Pride – An important feature of the 9th grade houses is supporting the development of school spirit.  Students will be provided opportunities to build their identities as members of a house, grade level and members of the greater Kalani High School community.
Kalani High School Houses:
Zentoku
'Imi'ike
Laulima

Notable alumni
 Tamari Miyashiro, volleyball player
 Dustin Kimura, professional mixed martial arts fighter
 Shane Komine, baseball player
 Ryan Kurosaki, baseball player
 Lenn Sakata, baseball player
 Roy Gerela, football player
 Mika Todd, singer
 Ehren Watada, First Lieutenant, United States Army
 Marcus Hill, or Dyrus, professional League of Legends player for Team SoloMid
 Mackey Feary, musician
 Sam Kong, State Representative
 Sheldyn Young, Pipikaula chef
Allison Chu, model and Miss Hawaii 2016
 Adrian Tam, Hawaii State Representative

Gallery

References

Public high schools in Honolulu
Educational institutions established in 1958
1958 establishments in Hawaii
East Honolulu, Hawaii